Mohammad Sarafraz is an Iranian media executive who was head of Islamic Republic of Iran Broadcasting (IRIB) from 2014 until his resignation in 2016.

He was the 6th Director-General of the IRIB and succeeded Ezatollah Zarghami on November 10, 2014. He holds a Ph.D in political sciences from Saint Joseph University of Beirut and MA from Imam Sadiq University . He is active in IRIB since 1993 in different posts and played a crucial role in launching Press TV, Hispan TV, al-Alam and iFilm television channels.

Careers in IRIB
Sarafraz was active in the Islamic Republic of Iran Broadcasting (IRIB) from 1993 and holds the position of Deputy Director-General in Foreign Affairs since 1995, being appointed by then Director-General Mohammad Hashemi Rafsanjani. He played a crucial role in launching Press TV, HispanTV, al-Alam and iFilm television channels.

On 1 November 2014, Sarafraz became new director-general of IRIB, succeeding Ezzatollah Zarghami. He officially takes office on 10 November. On 11 May 2016, he resigned from his post due to illness.

Controversy
In 2013, the European Union adopted restrictive measures against Sarafraz and recognized him as being associated with violating human rights and working with the Iranian security services and prosecutors to broadcast forced confessions of detainees.

References

External links 
 

1961 births
Living people
Saint Joseph University alumni
People from Tehran
Press TV people